Mohamad Faridzuean bin Kamaruddin (born 30 March 1995) is a Malaysian professional footballer who plays as a goalkeeper.

Club career

Kelantan
Faridzuean made his debut for Kelantan in a 2–1 win over Pahang on 29 July 2018.

Career statistics

Club

References

External links
 

Living people
1995 births
People from Kelantan
Malaysian people of Malay descent
Malaysian footballers
Association football goalkeepers
Malaysia Super League players
Malaysia Premier League players
Kelantan FA players
Kelantan F.C. players
Melaka United F.C. players
Sime Darby F.C. players
Kuala Lumpur City F.C. players